Frank Gerwer (born September 30, 1974) is a professional skateboarder.

He learned to ride a skateboard while growing up in Hicksville, Long Island, New York.

Gerwer's main contribution to skateboarding was being the first person to kickflip the Wallenberg Set, a set of steps located at a San Francisco school, on Saturday, October 27, 2001.

He was also the first person to kickflip the Brooklyn Banks stairs.

Gerwer's home address, Six Newell is widely known because of the video of the same name.

In 2016, Frank Gerwer guest starred on the Vice Program Vice Abandoned Route 66 Season 1 episode 6.

References

External links 
 video link (YouTube from Anti-Hero's "Cash Money Vagrant")

American skateboarders
Living people
People from Hicksville, New York
1974 births
Sportspeople from the San Francisco Bay Area